John Acland (c. 1674 – May 1703) was an English gentleman who briefly represented Callington in Parliament. He predeceased his father, Sir Hugh Acland, 5th Baronet.

Family and education
John was the eldest son of Sir Hugh Acland, 5th Baronet and his wife Anne. He matriculated at Exeter College, Oxford on 12 May 1692, at the age of 17.

On 24 March 1695/6, he married Elizabeth Acland, the daughter of Richard Acland of Barnstaple and sister of Richard Acland, a rather distant relative. He was survived by four sons and one daughter:
Sir Hugh Acland, 6th Baronet (c.1696–1728)
Richard Acland (d. 1735), a Portugal merchant, married Anne, daughter of Peter Burrell of Beckenham and sister of Sir Merrik Burrell, 1st Baronet, and had a daughter Anne, married on 7 May 1761 to Richard Hoare
Rev. John Acland (1699?–1744), rector of Broadclyst 1730–1744, married and had one son, Rev. John Acland (c.1729–1795)
Arthur Acland (d. 30 May 1740), married Elizabeth, daughter of Thomas Gilbert, on 18 May 1738, without issue
Elizabeth Acland (d. 1738), married on 3 May 1726 to Sir John Davie, 6th Baronet

Career
Acland stood for Parliament at Callington on the interest of John Rolle; John Rolle had married his cousin Florence Rolle, whose sister Margaret had married Acland's uncle Sir John Acland, 3rd Baronet. Like his father, he was not active in Parliament. He presumably shared in the Tory proclivities of his father, as he was considered a probable Tacker in a list of 1704, but the compiler was behind the times; Acland had died by then, and was buried at Broad Clyst on 20 May 1703.

References

1670s births
1703 deaths
Alumni of Exeter College, Oxford
English MPs 1702–1705
Members of the Parliament of England for Callington
Heirs apparent who never acceded
John 1674